Knife Edge is a 2009 British thriller film directed by Anthony Hickox and starring Natalie Press, Hugh Bonneville and Tamsin Egerton.

Plot
A successful Wall Street trader returns to Britain with her family, but her new home in the countryside contains a disturbing secret. Her understanding of this secret is complicated by her husbands' difficulties and losing his job. In trying to hide this, he uses gaslighting to trick her into believing she is going insane.

Her son Thomas's new friend Tobias, has the same name as the little boy who was murdered in the house 30 years ago. This difficult and clever doubling blurs what is truth and what is a delusion.

Cast

Production
Anthony Hickox directed the thriller and was produced by Fiona Combe, Pippa Cross and Janette Day. It was produced by Seven Arts Films and is the return of Hickox to the horror genre. Hickox shot the film in London and the Home Counties, England, UK. The film was based on a screenplay from Fiona Combe, Anthony Hickox and Robb Squire.

Release
The film was released on 19 October 2009 in the UK over Scanbox Entertainment and was set for a US release on 20 April 2010.

Soundtrack
The score was composed by Sphere Studios founder Guy Farley.

References

External links

2009 films
2009 horror films
2000s horror thriller films
British horror thriller films
2000s English-language films
2000s British films